John Knill (1 January 1733 – 29 March 1811) born at Callington in Cornwall was a slightly eccentric mayor of St Ives, Cornwall, UK, in 1767 and Collector of Customs at St Ives from 1762 to 1782. This obelisk was sited on the summit of Worvas hill (now known as "Knill's Monument", or "The Steeple") with views over St Ives Bay, with the intention that he should be buried in a vault within it, but his body was interred in St Andrew's Church, Holborn. The steeple bears on one side the painted coat of arms of Knill, with the Latin Nil Desperandum (Never Despair); also inscribed on the monument are the words of Johannes Knill 1782, Resurgam (I shall arise), and, in English, I know that my Redeemer liveth.

Biography
He was an attorney at Penzance and in 1777 Knill became the private secretary to the newly made Lord Lieutenant of Ireland, John Hobart the Earl of Buckinghamshire; returning to St Ives after six months in the post. A life-time friendship continued and Knill became a trustee of John Hobart's estate when he died in 1793. He also made a trip to the West Indies, collecting taxes for the King. The Cornishman newspaper claimed that he was engaged in privateering and according to local tradition took part in the smuggling trade.

Legacy

The cost of the monument erected on the summit of Worvas hill was £326 1s 6d; including five guineas to the owner of the land, Lord Arundel. There is, in the interior, a huge granite coffin, presumely for his body. In his will Knill left money for the upkeep of his obelisk and also £25 for celebrations to take place every five years on St James Day, 25 July. He directed that every five years £10 should be expended on a dinner, and that ten young girls dressed in white should walk in procession with music, from the market house to the monument, around which the whole party was to dance singing the hundredth psalm (All people that on earth do dwell). This quintennial commemoration is made the occasion for a good deal of jollity, in which the entire population joins, indeed the whole proceeding is quite mirth-provoking; nor is the least laughable part of it the looks on the faces of the vicar and mayor, as they sedately waltz around on the upper step of the monument, hand in hand with the ten young girls. The first ceremony, in which Knill himself participated, took place in 1801.

The £25 was to be spent thus:- 
 £10 for a dinner for the Trustees, who are the Mayor, Vicar, and Customs Officer, and two guests each. This to take place at the George and Dragon Inn, Market Place, St Ives.
 £5 to ten young girls who have to be the daughters of either fishermen, tinners, or seamen.
 £1 to the fiddler.
 £2 to two widows.
 £5 to the man and wife, widower or widow who shall raise the greatest family of legitimate children who have reached the age of ten years.
 £1 for white ribbon for breast knots.
 £1 to be set aside for a vellum book for the Clerk to the Trustees to record the proceedings.

The 45th, and latest, ceremony was held on Monday, 26 July 2021 (25 July was a Sunday). The ten dancing girls were paid £5 each, two widows £10 each and the fiddler £25. After assembling at the Guildhall, the girls danced up to the Malakoff, led by the fiddler. At the Malakoff they were transported up to Knill's Monument in buses.

It has been surmised that the building of the monument followed a pamphlet Knill allegedly authored castigating the repeated use of consecrated ground for burial, which mirrored a contemporary minor philosophical movement. Certainly, the parish church nearest to Knill's residence (St Ia) has, in modern times, a greatly raised churchyard partly as a result of this practice, being over seven feet higher than the pavements and walkways which lead around it. However, Knill's work and official appointments led him away from St Ives and his intended mausoleum, and his philosophical rapprochement with ecclesiastical interment may or may not have occurred. Knill died at his chambers on 29 March 1811 in Gray's Inn Square London and is buried in St Andrew's Church, Holborn.

Notable dates
 The two hundredth anniversary of Knill's death occurred on 29 March 2011
 The last ceremony took place on 26 July 2021
 The next ceremony will take place on 25 July 2026

The monument on Worvas hill is above the  contour and is a prominent landmark which vessels off the coast use as a navigation aid.

References

External links

 Rick Parsons' West Penwith resources
 Biographical sketch, "John Knill, 1733–1811"
 

1733 births
1811 deaths
Festivals in Cornwall
Members of Gray's Inn
Monuments and memorials in Cornwall
People from Callington, Cornwall
People from St Ives, Cornwall